Pangkor is a state constituency in Perak, Malaysia, that has been represented in the Perak State Legislative Assembly.

The state constituency was first contested in 1974 and is mandated to return a single Assemblyman to the Perak State Legislative Assembly under the first-past-the-post voting system.

Definition 
The Pangkor constituency boasts area of Manjung district that famous for tourism industry including township of Lumut, Marina Island, Teluk Batik, Damai Laut and Pangkor Island. The largest demographic voters for the constituency comes from naval base of TLDM. It contains the polling districts of Damar Laut, Lumut, Teluk Muroh, Pengkalan TLDM, Sungai Pinang Besar, Sungai Pinang Kechil, Pasir Bogak, Pekan Pangkor, and Telok Gedong.

Demographics

History

Polling districts
According to the federal gazette issued on 31 October 2022, the Pangkor constituency is divided into 9 polling districts.

Representation History

Election results

See also 
 Constituencies of Perak

References 

Perak state constituencies